Mannose-1-phosphate guanyltransferase beta is an enzyme that in humans is encoded by the GMPPB gene.

This gene is thought to encode a GDP-mannose pyrophosphorylase. This enzyme catalyzes the reaction which converts mannose-1-phosphate and GTP to GDP-mannose which is involved in the production of N-linked oligosaccharides. The gene encodes two transcript variants.

References

Further reading